The Burial Act 1854 (17 & 18 Vict c 87)  is an Act of the Parliament of the United Kingdom. It is one of the Burial Acts 1852 to 1885. Its purpose was to give provision for town councils to establish form burial boards to create and maintain cemeteries for parishes within the jurisdiction using funds from the Borough Rate.

The Act was repealed by the Statute Law Revision Act 1892.

References

Burials in the United Kingdom
Legal aspects of death
United Kingdom Acts of Parliament 1854
Cemeteries in the United Kingdom